List of notable events in music that took place in the year 1971.

Specific locations
1971 in British music
1971 in Norwegian music

Specific genres
1971 in country music
1971 in heavy metal music
1971 in jazz

Events
February 1 – After months of feuding in the press, Ginger Baker and Elvin Jones hold a "drum battle" at The Lyceum.
February 3 – Davy Jones announces he is leaving the Monkees.
February 8 – Bob Dylan's hour-long documentary film, Eat the Document, is premièred at New York's Academy of Music. The film includes footage from Dylan's 1966 UK tour.
February 16 – Alan Passaro of the Hells Angels, who was acquitted on January 19 of the stabbing death of Meredith Hunter at the Altamont Speedway in 1969, files a lawsuit against The Rolling Stones for invasion of privacy because the documentary film Gimme Shelter showed the stabbing.
February 19 – Queen performs their first public concert in London
March 1 – The line-up for Queen is completed when bassist John Deacon joins the band.
March 4 – The Rolling Stones open their UK tour in Newcastle upon Tyne, intended as a "farewell" to the UK prior to the band's relocation to France as "tax exiles".
March 5 – Ulster Hall, Belfast, Northern Ireland, sees the first live performance of Led Zeppelin's iconic song "Stairway to Heaven".
March 6 – The Soul to Soul concert takes place in Accra, Ghana, headlined by Wilson Pickett.
March 12–13 – The Allman Brothers Band records its live album, At Fillmore East.
March 16 – The 13th Grammy Awards, honoring musical accomplishments of 1970, are presented. The ceremonies are broadcast on live television for the first time. Simon & Garfunkel win Album of the Year, Record of the Year and Song of the Year for their final album Bridge over Troubled Water and its title track. The Carpenters win Best New Artist.
April 3 – The 16th Eurovision Song Contest, held in the Gaiety Theatre, Dublin, is won by Monaco with the song "Un banc, un arbre, une rue" sung by Séverine.
April 6 – The Rolling Stones hold a party in Cannes to officially announce their new contract with Atlantic and the launch of Rolling Stones Records.
April 8 – A bomb explodes at a CBC band gig in Saigon killing 2.
April 19 – Gil Scott Heron records the first rap song, The Revolution Will Not Be Televised in RCA Studioe in New York.
May 1 – Bill Withers releases seminal first album Just As I Am.
May 12 – Mick Jagger marries Bianca de Macías in Saint-Tropez, France, in a Roman Catholic ceremony. Among the wedding guests are the remaining Rolling Stones, Paul McCartney, Ringo Starr, Eric Clapton and Stephen Stills.
June – Rafael Kubelík becomes music director of the Metropolitan Opera, New York, at the invitation of Göran Gentele, the new general manager.
June 1 – Elvis Presley's birthplace, a two-room shack in Tupelo, Mississippi, is opened to the public as a tourist attraction.
June 6 – John Lennon and Yoko Ono join Frank Zappa on stage at the Fillmore East for an encore jam. The performance would be released the following year on the Some Time in New York City album.
June 8 – Carole King gives her first live concert, at Carnegie Hall.
June 20-24 – The first Glastonbury Festival to take place at the summer solstice is held in South West England. Performers include David Bowie, Traffic, Fairport Convention, Quintessence and Hawkwind.
June 27 – Promoter Bill Graham closes the Fillmore East in New York City with a final concert featuring The Allman Brothers Band, The Beach Boys and Mountain. Patrons are given commemorative posters at the door and find red roses on their seats.
July 3 – Jim Morrison is found dead in a bath tub in Paris, France, aged 27. Alain Ronay would claim, years later, that he assisted Morrison's lover, Pamela Courson, in covering up the circumstances.
July 4 – The Fillmore West is closed in San Francisco with a final show featuring Santana, Creedence Clearwater Revival and The Grateful Dead.
July 9 – Grand Funk Railroad becomes only the second band (after The Beatles) to perform a sold-out concert at Shea Stadium breaking The Beatles record of selling out the venue.
August 1
The Concert for Bangladesh at Madison Square Garden, New York, starring George Harrison, Ravi Shankar, Ringo Starr, Bob Dylan and Leon Russell; also featuring Billy Preston, Eric Clapton, Jesse Ed Davis and Badfinger.
The Sonny & Cher Comedy Hour premieres on CBS.
August 14 – The Who release their fifth studio album Who's Next, reaching Number One in both the UK and the US.
August 31 – John Lennon leaves Britain for New York City and will never return.
September 11 – The Jackson 5ive, a Saturday morning cartoon series based on the popular Motown group The Jackson 5, premieres on ABC.
September 11-12 – The Avandaro rock festival takes place in Valle de Bravo (Mexico) with an estimated attendance of 300,000.
October 5 – Black Sabbath perform the first set of their Whisky a Go Go performance in all-white tuxedos.
October 29 – The Allman Brothers Band's guitarist Duane Allman dies in a motorcycle accident in Macon, Georgia after colliding with a truck.
October 31 – Pink Floyd release their sixth studio album Meddle. The album is considered a turning point, moving away from their psychedelic sound to a more progressive tone. It peaked at No. 3 on the UK Albums Chart.
November 6 – Cher earns her first solo number one hit in US (Gypsys, Tramps & Thieves) staying atop for two consecutive weeks. Eventually the song was certified gold.
November 8 – Led Zeppelin release officially untitled fourth studio album, which would become the biggest-selling album of the year (1972), the band's biggest-selling album, and the fourth best-selling album of all time.
December 1 – Belgian singing duo Nicole & Hugo are married at Wemmel.
December 4 – The Montreux Casino in Montreux, Switzerland, catches fire and burns during a performance by Frank Zappa and the Mothers of Invention when a fan fires a flare gun into its rafters. Members of Deep Purple, who were due to begin recording at the casino the next day, watched the scene from their hotel across Lake Geneva, and later immortalized the events in their song, "Smoke on the Water".
December 10 – Frank Zappa breaks his leg after being pushed off the stage by a deranged fan at The Rainbow in London.
December 31 – Bob Dylan makes a surprise appearance for the encore of The Band's New Year's Eve concert at the Academy of Music, joining the group for four songs including "Like a Rolling Stone".
 Lancelot Layne's "Blown Away" is the beginning of rapso music.
 Ann Wilson joins Heart, which moves to Vancouver, British Columbia.
 Kenny Rogers and The First Edition issued their Greatest Hits album, which will sell over 4 million copies worldwide by the end of the decade. They also star in their own TV series Rollin' on the River which runs until 1974.
 Brad Whitford replaces Ray Tabano on rhythm guitar in Aerosmith
 Elton John has first international hit with "Your Song".
 Donna Summer begins her recording career under her real name of Donna Gaines.
 Rick Springfield leaves Zoot for a highly successful solo career.
 Rick Wakeman joins Yes.
 Conrad Schnitzler leaves Kluster, which dissolves.
 The Beach Boys musician Daryl Dragon and singer Toni Tennille meet and begin to perform together as Captain & Tennille.
 The American Musical Instrument Society is founded.

Bands formed
See Musical groups established in 1971

Bands reformed
 The Crystals

Bands disbanded
 Booker T. & the M.G.'s
 Derek and the Dominos
The Haunted
 The Monkees
See also Musical groups disestablished in 1971

Albums released

January

February

March

April

May

June

July

August
{|class="wikitable"
!Day
!Album
!Artist
!Notes
|-
|rowspan="2" valign="top" |1
| The Best of the Wailers || Bob Marley and the Wailers ||–
|-
| In Hearing of Atomic Rooster || Atomic Rooster ||–
|-
|rowspan="1" valign="top" |2
| Fillmore East – June 1971 || The Mothers of Invention || Live
|-
|rowspan="1" valign="top" |11
| You've Got a Friend || Johnny Mathis ||–
|-
|rowspan="2" valign="top" |14
| Al Green Gets Next to You || Al Green ||–
|-
| Who's Next || The Who ||–
|-
|rowspan="1" valign="top" |27
| One Dozen Roses || Smokey Robinson & The Miracles ||–
|-
|rowspan="1" valign="top" |30
| Surf's Up || The Beach Boys ||–
|-
|rowspan="1" valign="top" |31
| The Sun, Moon & Herbs || Dr. John ||–
|-
|rowspan="18" valign="top" |–
| Barbra Joan Streisand || Barbra Streisand ||–
|-
| Cedartown, Georgia || Waylon Jennings ||–
|-
| Freedom Flight || Shuggie Otis ||–
|-
| Himself || Gilbert O'Sullivan ||–
|-
| Hot Pants || James Brown ||–
|-
| I Wonder What She'll Think About Me Leaving || Conway Twitty ||–
|-
| If 3 || If ||–
|-
| My Baby Packed Up My Mind and Left Me || Dallas Frazier ||–
|-
| New Riders of the Purple Sage || New Riders of the Purple Sage ||–
|-
| Nigel Olsson's Drum Orchestra and Chorus || Nigel Olsson ||–
|-
| Ronnie Milsap || Ronnie Milsap ||–
|-
| A Space in Time || Ten Years After ||–
|-
| Sometimes I Just Feel Like Smilin''' || Butterfield Blues Band ||–
|-
| Van Ronk || Dave Van Ronk ||–
|-
| White Light || Gene Clark || aka Gene Clark|-
| Tago Mago || Can ||–
|-
|}

September

October

November

December

Release date unknown

Biggest hit singles
The following songs achieved the highest chart positions
in the charts of 1971.

Top 40 Chart hit singles

Other Chart hit singles

Notable singles

Other Notable singles
"Come Back Again" - Daddy Cool
"Spoon" b/w "Shikaku Maru Ten" - Can

Published popular music
 "The Age of Not Believing" – w.m. Richard M. Sherman and Robert B. Sherman, from the film Bedknobs and Broomsticks "Always on My Mind" – w.m. Johnny Christopher, Mark James and Wayne Carson Thompson
 "American Pie" – w.m. Don McLean
 "And I Love You So" – w.m. Don McLean
 "And the Band Played Waltzing Matilda – w.m. Eric Bogle (written)
 "Baby I'm-a Want You" – w.m. David Gates
 "Been on a Train" – w.m. Laura Nyro
 "Ben" – w. Don Black m. Walter Scharf
 "The Candy Man" – w.m. Leslie Bricusse & Anthony Newley, from the film Willy Wonka & the Chocolate Factory "Day By Day" – w. John Michael Tebelak m. Stephen Schwartz
 "Eagle Rock" – w.m. Ross Wilson
 "How Can You Mend a Broken Heart" w.m. Barry Gibb and Robin Gibb
 "I Am Woman" – w. Helen Reddy m. Ray Burton
 "I Don't Know How to Love Him" w. Tim Rice m. Andrew Lloyd Webber. Introduced by Yvonne Elliman in the musical Jesus Christ Superstar "I'd Like to Teach the World to Sing" – w.m. B. Backer, B. Davis, R. Cook & R. Greenaway
 "I'm Still Here" – w.m. Stephen Sondheim
 "Imagine w.m. John Lennon
 "Kiss an Angel Good Morning" – w.m. Ben Peters
 "Knock Three Times" – w.m. Irwin Levine
 "The Last Farewell" – w.m. Roger Whittaker & Ron A. Webster
 "Losing My Mind" – w.m. Stephen Sondheim
 "Maggie May" w.m. Rod Stewart and Martin Quittenton
 "Pure Imagination" – w.m. Leslie Bricusse & Anthony Newley, from the film Willy Wonka & the Chocolate Factory "Riders on the Storm" – w.m. The Doors
 "Stairway to Heaven" – w. Robert Plant m. Jimmy Page
 "Substitutiary Locomotion" – w.m. Richard M. Sherman and Robert B. Sherman, from the film Bedknobs and Broomsticks "The Summer Knows" – w. Alan Bergman & Marilyn Bergman m. Michel Legrand from the film Summer of '42 "Those Were the Days" w. Lee Adams, m. Charles Strouse, from the TV series All in the Family "Too Many Mornings" – w.m. Stephen Sondheim
 "Avec le Temps" – Dalida
 "Mamy Blue" – Dalida
"Queen of the Hours" w.m. Jeff Lynne, Roy Wood

Classical music

Premieres

Compositions
 Malcolm Arnold – Viola Concerto with small orchestra
 Gavin Bryars – Jesus' Blood Never Failed Me Yet Elliott Carter – String Quartet No. 3
 George CrumbLux Aeterna for soprano, bass flute/soprano recorder, sitar, and percussion (two players)Vox Balaenae (Voice of the Whale) for electric flute, electric cello, and amplified piano
 Mario Davidovsky – Chacona for violin, cello, and piano
 Morton Feldman – Rothko Chapel Lorenzo Ferrero – Primavera che non vi rincresca Jørgen Jersild – Three Danish Romances Mauricio Kagel – Staatstheater Ladislav Kupkovič – Klanginvasion auf Bonn Helmut Lachenmann – Gran Torso for string quartets
 Jean Langlais – Concerto for Organ no 3 "Reaction"
 Luigi Nono – Ein Gespenst geht um in der Welt Arvo Pärt – Symphony No. 3
 Steve Reich – Drumming Aulis Sallinen – Symphony No.1
 Dmitri Shostakovich – Symphony No. 15 in A major, Op. 141
 Karlheinz StockhausenSternklangTrans Iannis Xenakis
 Antikhthon, ballet for orchestra
 Aroura, for string ensemble of 12 players
 Charisma, for clarinet and cello
 Mikka, for violin
 Persépolis, 8-track tape music

Opera
 Alberto Ginastera – Beatrix Cenci, Opera Society of Washington in Washington, D.C., September 10
 Hans Werner Henze – Der langwierige Weg in die Wohnung der Natascha Ungeheuer, Deutsche Oper Berlin, September
 Lee Hoiby – Summer and Smoke Heitor Villa-Lobos – Yerma, Santa Fe Opera, Santa Fe, New Mexico, August 12

Jazz

Musical theater
 Ain't Supposed to Die a Natural Death – Off-Broadway production
 Follies (Stephen Sondheim) – Broadway production ran for 522 performances
 Godspell (Stephen Schwartz) – Broadway, London, and Off-Broadway productions; 572 performances on Broadway, 2,600 total NYC performances
 Jalta, Jalta (Alfi Kabiljo and Milan Grgić) – premièred in Zagreb
 Jesus Christ Superstar (Andrew Lloyd Webber and Tim Rice) – Broadway production opened at the Mark Hellinger Theatre and ran for 711 performances
 Lolita, My Love (John Barry and Alan Jay Lerner) – closed in pre-Broadway tryout
 Prettybelle – starring Angela Lansbury, closed in pre-Broadway tryout
 No, No, Nanette (Irving Caesar, Otto Harbach, Vincent Youmans) – Broadway revival
 On the Town – Broadway revival
 Show Boat (Jerome Kern and Oscar Hammerstein II) – London revival
 To Live Another Summer, To Pass Another Winter – Broadway production of Jewish revue; opened at the Helen Hayes Theatre on October 21 and transferred to the Lunt-Fontanne Theatre on January 10, 1972, for a total run of 173 performances.
 Two Gentlemen of Verona – Broadway production opened at the St. James Theatre and ran for 614 performances

Musical films
 200 Motels (American-British surrealist musical film)
 Aquellos años locos (Argentine musical film)
 Arriba Juventud (Argentine musical film)
 Bedknobs and Broomsticks Directed by Robert Stevenson and starring Angela Lansbury and David Tomlinson
 Bumbarash (Soviet musical film)
 Chervona Ruta (Soviet Ukrainian musical film)
 Fiddler on the Roof Haathi Mere Saathi (Hindi musical film)
 Journey Back to Oz (animated feature)
 Out of the Darkness (Thai science fiction musical film)
 Raga, documentary about the life and work of Ravi Shankar
 Willy Wonka & the Chocolate FactoryBirths
January 1 – Chris Potter, American saxophonist and composer
January 2 – Taye Diggs, American actor and singer

January 6 – Irwin Thomas, American-Australian singer-songwriter and guitarist
January 7 – Jeremy Renner, American actor and singer
January 8 – Karen Poole English singer-songwriter (Alisha's Attic, Kylie Minogue, Sugababes)
January 9 – Angie Martinez, American rapper and radio talk host
January 11
Mary J. Blige, American singer-songwriter, rapper, record producer and actress
Tom Rowlands (The Chemical Brothers)
Stuart Davis, lyricist
January 13 – Lee Agnew (Nazareth)
January 17 – Kid Rock, American singer
Lil Jon, American rapper, producer and actor
January 18 – Jonathan Davis (KoЯn)
January 19 – John Wozniak, American singer and songwriter (Marcy Playground)
January 20
Gary Barlow, British singer-songwriter (Take That)
Questlove, American musician, composer, producer, photographer and author
January 21 – Tweet, American singer
January 22 – Geoffrey Gurrumul Yunupingu, indigenous Australian ethnic singer and musician (died 2017)
January 25 – China Kantner (Daughter of Grace Slick and Paul Kantner)
January 28 – Anthony Hamilton, American singer
February 1 – Ron Welty (The Offspring)
February 2
Michelle Gayle, British singer
Ben Mize (Counting Crows)
February 3 – Christian Liljegren, Swedish singer-songwriter (Narnia, Audiovision and Divinefire)
February 5 – Sara Evans, American singer
February 13 – Sonia, English pop singer
February 15 – Daniel Powter, Canadian musician, singer and songwriter
February 16
Amanda Holden, British actress and singer
Steven Houghton, British actor and singer
February 18 – Merritt Gant, American guitarist (Overkill)
February 19 – Gil Shaham, violinist
February 22 – Lea Salonga, Filipina singer and Broadway Actress
February 26
 Erykah Badu, American singer-songwriter, record producer, disc jockey, activist and actress
 Max Martin , Pop music writer and producer (NSYNC, Britney Spears, Taylor Swift, Katy Perry)
February 27 – Rozonda "Chilli" Thomas, American singer (TLC)
March 1 
 Alex Konrad, German DJ and producer (Baracuda)
Thomas Adès,English classical composer, pianist and conductor
March 2 – Method Man, American rapper
March 4 – Fergal Lawler Irish drummer (The Cranberries)
March 6 – Betty Boo, English singer-songwriter and artist
March 9 – C-Murder, American rapper
March 11 – Erin O'Donnell, American Christian musician
March 21 – John Hendy, British singer (East 17)
March 26
Francis Lawrence, American music video director, photographer, director and producer
Jay Sean, English singer, songwriter and record producer
March 29 – Attila Csihar, Hungarian vocalist (Mayhem)
March 31 – Ewan McGregor, Scottish actor and singer
April 2 – Zeebra, Japanese rapper
April 3 – Wes Berggren, American musician
April 4 – Josh Todd, American rock singer (Buckcherry)
April 10 - Yoo Young-jin, South Korean singer-songwriter and producer
April 11 – Oliver Riedel, German musician (Rammstein)
April 16 – Selena (Quintanilla), American Tejano singer (killed 1995)
April 20 – Mikey Welsh, American alternative rock bassist and painter (Weezer) (died 2011)
April 24
Mauro Pawlowski, Belgian guitar player and singer (Evil Superstars, Deus)
Alejandro Fernández, Mexican singer
April 29
Siniša Vuco, Croatian musician
Tamara Johnson-George, American singer (SWV)
May 3 – Damon Dash, record label executive
May 6 – Chris Shiflett, American rock musician (Foo Fighters)
May 9 – Paul McGuigan British bassist (Oasis)
May 17 – Vernie Bennett, British singer (Eternal)
May 22
MC Eith, American rapper
Raimund Marasigan, drummer (Eraserheads)
May 27 – Lisa "Left Eye" Lopes, American rapper and songwriter TLC (died 2002)
May 30
Patrick Dahlheimer, Live
Idina Menzel, American actress and singer
May 31 – Adam Walton, British DJ
June 1 – Mario Cimarro, Cuban actor and singer
June 5 – Mark Wahlberg, American rapper and actor
June 9 – Erika Miklósa, Hungarian coloratura soprano
June 14 – Pritam, Indian singer, composer, instrumentalist
June 15 – Bif Naked, singer
June 16 – Tupac Shakur, American rapper, poet and actor (died 1996)
June 17 – Paulina Rubio, Mexican singer
June 18 – Nathan Morris American singer (Boyz II Men)
June 20 – Jeordie White, American singer-songwriter and bass player (Marilyn Manson, Nine Inch Nails, A Perfect Circle, Goon Moon and The Desert Sessions)
June 21 – Anette Olzon, Swedish singer-songwriter (Nightwish, Alyson Avenue)
June 27 – DJ Screw, rapper (died 2000)
June 29 – Matthew Good, Canadian musician
July 1 – Missy Elliott, American singer
July 4 – Andy Creeggan, Canadian guitarist and pianist (Barenaked Ladies and The Brothers Creeggan)
July 11 – Leisha Hailey, American musician and actress
July 12 – MC Breed, American rapper (died 2008)
July 13 – Jason Reece, American guitarist and drummer (...And You Will Know Us by the Trail of Dead and A Roman Scandal)
July 16 – Ed Kowalczyk, Live
July 17 – DJ Minutemix, P.M. Dawn
July 20 – DJ Screw, American hip hop deejay (died 2000)
July 21 – Charlotte Gainsbourg, French actress and singer-songwriter
July 23
Alison Krauss, American bluegrass-folk singer and musician
Scott Krippayne, American Christian musician
Dalvin DeGrate, American rapper (Jodeci)
July 30 – Calogero, singer
July 31 – John Lowery, American guitarist
August 3 – DJ Spinderella, American rapper (Salt-n-Pepa)
August 4 – Yo-Yo, rapper
August 7 – Rachel York, American actress and singer
August 12 – Phil Western, Canadian musician
August 17
Anthony Kearns, Irish tenor
Ed Motta, Brazilian soul and jazz musician
August 18 – Richard D. James, Irish musician
August 20 – Fred Durst, American singer (Limp Bizkit)
August 21 - Liam Howlett, British musician (The Prodigy)
August 23 – Bone Crusher, American rapper
August 25 – Joby Talbot, English-born composer
August 26 – Thalía, Mexican actress and singer
August 27 – Julian Cheung, Hong Kong actor and singer
August 28 – Neil Ekberg, drummer (Black Market Baby, Tesco Vee's Hate Police)
August 30 – Lars Frederiksen (Rancid)
September 1 – DJ Cocoa Chanelle, djer
September 6 – Dolores O'Riordan, Irish rock vocalist (The Cranberries) (died 2018)
September 8 – Vico C, American rapper and record producer
September 11 – Richard Ashcroft, British singer and songwriter
September 18 – Anna Netrebko, operatic soprano
September 19 – D-Flame, hip-hop and reggae performer
September 21 – Alfonso Ribeiro, American actor, singer and dancer
September 22 – Chesney Hawkes, English pop singer
September 24 – Marty Cintron American singer (No Mercy)
September 28 – A. J. Croce, singer-songwriter and son of Jim Croce
October 2
Tiffany, American singer, songwriter, actress and teen icon
Jim Root, guitarist for Slipknot
LeShaun, American rapper
October 3
Kevin Richardson American singer (Backstreet Boys)
 Black Thought, American rapper, MC and record producer (The Roots)
October 4 – Brian Transeau, American disc jockey
October 5 – South Park Mexican, American rapper
October 10 – Evgeny Kissin, Russian pianist
October 11 – MC Lyte, American rapper
October 17
Chris Kirkpatrick, American singer 'N Sync
Derrick Plourde (The Ataris) (died 2005)
October 20
Dannii Minogue, Australian singer
Snoop Dogg, American rapper
October 25
Athena Chu, Hong Kong actress and singer
Midori Gotō, Japanese violinist
October 26 – Anthony Rapp, American singer and actor
October 30 – John Alford, British singer and actor
November 5 
 Jonny Greenwood, British musician, songwriter and composer
 Edmond Leung, Hong Kong singer-songwriter and producer
November 6 – Joey Beltram, DJ and record producer
November 8 – Tech N9ne, American rapper
November 10 – Big Pun, American rapper and songwriter
November 12 – Tom Shear, American musician and producer
November 13 – Buddy Zabala, bassist (Eraserheads)
November 16 – Annely Peebo, operatic mezzo-soprano
November 18 – Özlem Tekin, Turkish singer
December 8 – Nick Zinner (Yeah Yeah Yeahs)
December 16 – Michael McCary, American singer (Boyz II Men)
December 20 – Roger J. Beaujard, American musician
December 24 – Ricky Martin, Puerto Rican singer
December 25
Dido, English singer
Noel Hogan Irish guitarist (The Cranberries)
December 26 – Jared Leto, American musician and actor (Thirty Seconds To Mars)
December 31 – Marcus Adoro, lead guitarist (Eraserheads)Date unknown – Simon O'Neill, New Zealand opera singer

Deaths

January 19 – Harry Shields, American musician (born 1899)
January 24 – Therese Wiet, Austrian operetta singer (born 1885)
February 1 – Harry Roy, British bandleader (born 1900)
February 7 – Dock Boggs, banjo player (born 1898)
March 6 – Thurston Dart, English harpsichordist and conductor (born 1921)
March 17 – Piero Coppola, Italian conductor, pianist and composer, 82
March 21 – Nan Wynn, US singer (born 1915)
March 26 – Harold McNair, saxophonist and flute player (born 1931) (lung cancer)
March 30 – Harold Craxton, pianist and composer, 85
March 31 – Karl King, composer and bandleader (born 1891)
April 6 – Igor Stravinsky, composer (born 1882)
April 17 – Carmen Lombardo, US singer, composer and saxophonist, 67
May 2 – Edith Day, US actress, singer and dancer (born 1896)
May 30 – Marcel Dupré, organist and composer (born 1886)
June 11 – Ambrose, English bandleader and violinist (born 1896)
June 18 – Libby Holman, US singer and actress (born 1906)
June 26 – Inia Te Wiata, New Zealand Māori bass-baritone opera singer, 56 (cancer)
July 3 – Jim Morrison, lead singer of The Doors, 27 (heart failure, disputed)
July 6 – Louis Armstrong, US jazz pioneer, 69 (heart attack)
July 24 – Alan Rawsthorne, British composer, 66
July 25 – Leroy Robertson, American composer, 74
August 9 – Leslie Kong, Jamaican record producer (born 1933)
August 13 – King Curtis, jazz and blues musician (born 1934) (murdered)
August 15 – Edythe Baker, boogie-woogie pianist, 71
August 17 – Tab Smith, saxophonist, 62
August 25 – Ted Lewis, singer and bandleader, 81
August 27 – Lil Hardin Armstrong, wife and musical collaborator of Louis Armstrong, 73
September 13 – George Lambert, operatic baritone and voice teacher, 70
October 2 – Bola de Nieve, Cuban singer, pianist, and songwriter, 60
October 3 – Seán Ó Riada, composer and bandleader, 40 (cirrhosis of liver)
October 12 – Gene Vincent, singer, 36 (stomach ulcer)
October 24 – Carl Ruggles, composer, 95
October 29 – Duane Allman of The Allman Brothers Band, 24 (motorcycle accident)
November 4 – Ann Pennington, American actress & dancer, 77
November 18 – Junior Parker, blues musician, 39 (brain tumour)
November 22 – Zez Confrey, popular composer and pianist, 76
December 8 – Marie Collier, operatic soprano, 44 (death from a fall)
December 21 – Charlie Fuqua, vocalist (The Ink Spots)
December 28 – Max Steiner, composer, 83date unknown – Marie-Anne Asselin, operatic mezzo-soprano and voice teacher

Awards

Grammy Awards
 Grammy Awards of 1971

Country Music Association Awards
 Entertainer of the Year: Charley Pride
 Top Male Vocalist: Charley Pride
 Top Female Vocalist: Lynn Anderson
 Top Vocal Group: Osborne Brothers
 Top Instrumental Group: Danny Davis & the Nashville Brass
 Top Vocal Duo: Porter Wagoner and Dolly Parton
 Single of the Year: "Help Me Make It Through The Night" – Sammi Smith
 Song of the Year: "Easy Loving" – Freddie Hart
 Album of the Year: I Won't Mention It Again'' – Ray Price
 Musician of the Year: Jerry Reed

Eurovision Song Contest
 Eurovision Song Contest 1971
 Séverine (of Monaco) for "Un banc, un arbre, une rue"

References

External links
 

 
20th century in music
Music by year